Flower Hill Cemetery is located in North Bergen, New Jersey. It is cojoined with Hoboken Cemetery and Machpelah Cemetery.

History
Some of the others who perished in the massive fire on the Hoboken piers in 1900 were buried at the adjacent cemeteries in gravesites purchased by the shipping company.

Headstones of interest include those of American Civil War soldiers Decatur Dorsey and Christian Woerner, and the side-by-side headstones of World War I Army privates Horace Shields and Freeman Norris, who died just over a month apart in June and July 1949. One headstone regarded as among the most interesting is the faux tree-trunk of Frank and Sally Bello, who died in 1956 and 1992, respectively, and which was dedicated by their children. Among those regarded as the most poignant are the Guidotti plot and the Adolph Lankering Family Vault. The former includes a four-foot-tall headstone with a right-hand side column with a curled leaves etching. At the top of the column is depicted a tree branch cross and roses, and chiseled oval spaces for the four children, two of which are filled as of 2013.

Notable burials
 Ed Alberian (1920–1997) children's television actor and entertainer
 Frank J. Bart (1883–1961) World War I Medal of Honor recipient
 Decatur Dorsey (1836–1891) Civil War Medal of Honor recipient
 William Joseph Peter  (1832–1918), brewer, painter, philanthropist
 Charles Schreyvogel, (1861–1912), American painter known for Western scenes
 One Commonwealth war grave of a Royal Marine Light Infantry Private of World War I.

See also
 List of cemeteries in Hudson County, New Jersey

References

External links 
 
 New Jersey Civil War Gravestones

North Bergen, New Jersey
Cemeteries in Hudson County, New Jersey
1873 establishments in New Jersey